Super Show 7 is the third world concert tour and seventh tour overall by South Korean boy band Super Junior, in support of their eighth studio album,  Play. The world tour commenced with three shows in Seoul from December 15 to 17, 2017 and hit a total of 120 concerts for its Super Show series.

This tour marks the return of members Siwon, Eunhyuk and Donghae, who had been away serving two years of mandatory military service. Ryeowook joined the tour in November 2018 following his military discharge.

Concerts
The tour was announced on November 10, 2017, after Super Junior started the promotion for their eighth studio album, Play. Tickets for the December 16–17 "Super Show 7 Concert Tour" in Seoul, went on sale on November 21, 2017, and were sold out in nine minutes. 

Later, the group added one more concert on December 15, 2017, due to high demand. The tickets went on sale on November 26. The concert on December 15, 2017, marked the 120th Super Show concert in the Super Show series.

The concert in Singapore was announced on December 1, by ONE Production. It had been two years since Super Junior had previously performed in Singapore. The Bangkok show on January 28 was played to 10,000 people and was sold out in five minutes.

Setlist

Tour dates

Personnel
 Artists: Super Junior members Leeteuk, Heechul, Yesung, Shindong, Eunhyuk, Donghae, Siwon and Ryeowook (only from November Bangkok stop); Leslie Grace (Latin America); Play-N-Skillz (Peru, Chile and Mexico); Rossa (Indonesia)
 Tour organizer: SM Entertainment
 Tour promoter: Dream Maker Entercom

Awards

References

External links
 Dream Maker Entercom 
 Super Junior official homepage 

2017 concert tours
2018 concert tours
2019 concert tours
Super Junior concert tours
K-pop concerts